Auni Elisabet Nuolivaara ( Lagus, later Hirvensalo; 22 May 1883 — 26 October 1972) was a Finnish writer and artist.

Personal life
Auni Hirvensalo was born to Selim Hirvensalo ( Lagus) and Lydia  Dahlström. Her younger brother was the translator and dictionarist Lauri Hirvensalo (1892-1965).

She was married to the linguist and educator Armas Nuolivaara, PhD.

Career

Teacher
Nuolivaara qualified as a teacher in 1905, and worked at primary, secondary and folk high school levels as teacher of music, French and other subjects, as well as head teacher, on and off for the next 20 years.

Artist
She was a keen amateur artist, making several study trips around Europe, as well as learning drawing and painting at the Accademia di Belle Arti di Roma in Italy, until the outbreak of World War I disrupted her travels.

Writer
Nuolivaara is most notable as a writer, best remembered for her novel Paimen, piika ja emäntä ( 'The Shepherd, Maid and Mistress'), which won the 1936 Otava book award, was translated into several languages, and made into a 1938 film by the same name. She later wrote a sequel, Paimen, piika ja emäntä — II.

The 1984 Japanese anime series Katri, Girl of the Meadows (牧場の少女カトリ, Makiba no Shōjo Katori) is based on Paimen, piika ja emäntä.

Her other notable works include the novels Sinä olet se mies...! (1927), Isäntä ja emäntä (1937; the third and final part of the Paimen, piika ja emäntä trilogy), Kiitollisuuden yrtti (1940), and Syy oli minun (1952). Nuolivaara's published works comprise more than a dozen novels, a play, a radio drama and a children's book.

Notes

References

Finnish women writers
20th-century Finnish writers
1883 births
1972 deaths